Richard William "Dick" Taylor (born January 23, 1938) was an American cross-country skier who competed from 1955 to 1965. He competed in the 1964 Winter Olympics. Taylor was born in Gardner, Massachusetts.

References

1938 births
Living people
American male cross-country skiers
Olympic cross-country skiers of the United States
Cross-country skiers at the 1964 Winter Olympics
Dartmouth College alumni
People from Gardner, Massachusetts
Sportspeople from Worcester County, Massachusetts